Elisabeth "Liesl" Perkaus (later Richter, May 24, 1905 – January 27, 1987) was an Austrian track and field athlete who competed in the 1928 Summer Olympics.

In 1928 she finished sixth in the discus throw event.

In 1931 Perkaus earned a bronze medal at the Olympics of Grace in the Swedish relay (with Herma Schurinek, Veronika Kohlbach, Liesl Perkaus and Maria Weese).

References

External links
profile

1905 births
1987 deaths
Austrian female discus throwers
Olympic athletes of Austria
Athletes (track and field) at the 1928 Summer Olympics
Women's World Games medalists